The Penrith Co-operative Society Limited, known locally as Penrith Co-op, was a small regional consumer co-operative in the United Kingdom. The society was formed in 1890 and at the time of its merger with Scotmid it operated one department store with supermarket attached and eight small supermarkets or convenience stores in Cumbria and County Durham.

History

When most other co-operatives in Cumbria merged into regional groups in the 1960s and 1970s, such as the Cumbrian Society and the Greater Lancastria Society (now both part of The Co-operative Group), the Penrith society remained independent and has since taken over other small societies. These included the Keswick Co-operative Society in 1969; the Lazonby & District Co-operative Society in 1990; the Naworth Collieries Co-operative Society in 1993 which had branches in the small north Pennine villages of Hallbankgate and Halton-Lea-Gate and most recently, in 2002, the Stanhope & Weardale Co-operative Society.

The Penrith Co-op was featured on a 2006 episode of the national BBC Television programme Working Lunch for its support of the Melmerby village store set up by residents. The Melmerby village shop has since closed down.

In June 2013 it was announced that they were proposing a merger with Scottish giant Co-operative Scotmid, subject to membership approval.  The merger was completed in October 2013 with the stores to be refurbished and rebranded as the Lakes & Dales Co-operative the first store that was rebranded was the Lazonby branch.

In 2015 Scotmid closed the non-food departments of the Penrith store and refurbished and made smaller the food departments. This was ultimately unsuccessful and the entire store closed in February 2016.

Operations

In 2008, the society began refurbishing its Penrith department store and supermarket, with a new theme of "the Number 19 Department Store", with its various departments labelled or branded as being "@19", such as the new brand for the clothing department: "Style@19".

Head Office, No. 19 department store and Penrith supermarket
The premises at 19 Burrowgate, Penrith housed the following departments: grocery, butchery, bakery, fashion, electronics, homewares, beds, furniture, carpets and cafe.

Branches in 2013

 Keswick Foodstore & Electrical Store, St James Court, Keswick, Cumbria
 Lazonby Foodstore and Post Office, Lazonby, Cumbria
 Shap Supermarket, Main Street, Shap Cumbria
 Hallbankgate Foodstore and Post Office, Hallbankgate, Cumbria
 Stanhope Foodstore, Off Licence and Handybank, Front Street, Stanhope, County Durham
 St Johns Chapel Foodstore, Market Place, St John's Chapel, County Durham
 Westgate Foodstore, Front Street, Westgate, County Durham
 Frosterley Foodstore & Post Office, Front Street, Frosterley, County Durham

Branches closed before 2013

 Great Dockray, Penrith (the society's original store)
 Castlegate, Penrith (the society's 2nd store closed on move to Burrowgate)
 Castletown, Penrith (closed c.1970)
 Halton Lea Gate
 Scotland Road, Townhead, Penrith (closed c.1970)
 Penrith Pharmacy, (became part of department store in 1980s and later closed)
 Glenridding
 Shap No2 and No 5
 Keswick Home Store
 Wearhead (closed 2005)

Other Operations

The society for many years ran mobile shops visiting various villages and hamlets in the Penrith area.

Penrith Co-op built and owned several residential properties in Penrith including Holyoake Terrace in Castletown and Walker Rise at Fair Hill.

Co-operative movement
The society was a member of the UK-wide Co-operative Retail Trading Group (CRTG) and sold The Co-operative brand products.  It was also a corporate member of hybrid consumer and wholesale co-operative, the Co-operative Group.

In 2005, Rochdale-based United Co-operatives bought a private sector pharmacy shop in Penrith which changed its name to Co-operative Pharmacy. However, this shop had no connection with Penrith Co-op's operations and, since United merged with the Co-operative Group in 2007, it formed part of the Co-operative Group Pharmacy division which has since been sold to The Bestway Group.

In 2010 the Co-operative Group rebranded the Penrith branch of Somerfield as a Co-operative Food store. Until 2015, when the store closed, Penrith had two Co-op stores owned by two separate societies.

References

External links
 penrithco-op.co.uk – official website

Consumers' co-operatives of the United Kingdom
Former co-operatives of the United Kingdom
Companies based in Cumbria
Penrith, Cumbria
Retail companies established in 1890
Retail companies disestablished in 2013
British companies established in 1890
2013 disestablishments in the United Kingdom
Defunct department stores of the United Kingdom